John Probyn (died 1843) was an Anglican priest in the late 18th and early 19th centuries.

Probyn was born at Newland, Gloucestershire, a descendant of Sir Edmund Probyn. He was educated at Christ Church, Oxford. He held incumbencies at Abenhall and Matherne. He was Dean and Archdeacon of Llandaff from 1796 to his death on 4 October 1843.

References 

Archdeacons of Llandaff
Deans of Llandaff
Alumni of Christ Church, Oxford
1843 deaths
1761 births
People from Forest of Dean District